"I Don't Believe You Want to Get Up and Dance (Oops!)" (re-titled "Oops Up Side Your Head" on the single as well as being known by other titles such as "Oops Upside Your Head") is a 1979 song recorded by the R&B group the Gap Band. Released off their fourth studio album, The Gap Band II, the song and its parent album both achieved commercial success.

The single was released in several countries in different formats. In the United States, it was a 12" with the B-side being "Party Lights". In the Netherlands, the 12" B-side was "The Boys Are Back in Town". In France, the single was a 7" with no B-side.

In the UK, the track first surfaced in mid-late 1979 as the B-side of the 12" release of "The Boys Are Back in Town" / "Steppin' (Out)". Then in 1980, due to its popularity, it was flipped and re-titled with just "The Boys Are Back in Town" as the B-side. It was later released once again as the B-side to some copies of the remix version of "Party Lights". In 1987, a 12" remix was released in the UK with a dub version B-side.

The single became an international hit for the group upon its late 1979 release. Though it failed to reach the Billboard Hot 100 (peaking at number two on its Bubbling Under Hot 100 chart), the song hit the top ten on the US R&B and disco charts and became a big-seller overseas where it peaked at number six in the UK in 1980 and number six in the Netherlands.

Structure
The song, which runs for nearly nine minutes in the full 12" single version, features a driving bass-line with a simple repeated E-G-A-B pattern.

P-Funk influence 

The humorous monologues throughout the song by Gap Band lead singer Charlie Wilson were inspired by his cousin Bootsy Collins' own humorous slant in his songs.
Wilson's spoken intro, "this is radio station W-GAP", was a reference to Parliament's opening line in "P. Funk (Wants to Get Funked Up)", "welcome to radio station W-E-F-U-N-K, better known as WE-FUNK."
The line, "the bigger the headache the bigger the pill, the bigger the doctor the bigger the bill" was said to be influenced by similar lines from Parliament-Funkadelic in the mid-'70s including the line "the bigger the headache, the bigger the pill" in "Dr. Funkenstein". The Jack & Jill line would later be continued on their next anthem, "Humpin'".
The horn break is a direct lift from the intro to "Disco to Go" by The Brides of Funkenstein.
The band made little use of the synthesizer prior to this song, and the use of the synthesizer expanded with each passing album. By 1982, most of the band's hits were synthesizer-laden electrofunk.
The Gap Band III featured "Humpin'" and "Burn Rubber on Me (Why You Wanna Hurt Me)" which use even more synthesizer than this song. 
By Gap Band IV, almost all the songs which were not quiet storm-style ballads were heavily laden with synthesizer. The use of synthesizers led to two songs, "Early in the Morning" and "You Dropped a Bomb on Me" topping the R&B charts in 1982.

Nursery rhyme allusions
"Jack and Jill went up the hill to have a little fun/stupid Jill forgot her pill and now they've got a son."
Their 1980 song, "Humpin'", also references Jack & Jill.
"Humpty Dumpty sat on the wall/Humpty Dumpty had a great fall... I say he cracked on the whack!"
Little Miss Muffet is also mentioned.

Legacy
In April 2015, it was announced that the writers of "Oops Up Side Your Head" had had their names added to the writing credits of Mark Ronson's hit single "Uptown Funk".

Charts

Weekly charts

Year-end charts

References

1979 songs
1979 singles
1980 singles
The Gap Band songs
Songs written by Lonnie Simmons
Songs written by Charlie Wilson (singer)
Songs written by Rudy Taylor
Mercury Records singles
Songs about dancing
1979 neologisms
Quotations from music
Novelty and fad dances